FC Viktoria Otrokovice is a Czech football club located in Otrokovice in the Zlín Region. It currently plays in the Moravian–Silesian Football League, which is the third tier of Czech football.

References

External links
 Official website 
 Profile at idnes.cz 

Football clubs in the Czech Republic
Zlín District